Elections to Sheffield City Council were held on 4 May 1978. One third of the council was up for election.

Election result

This result had the following consequences for the total number of seats on the Council after the elections:

Ward results

Reg Munn was a sitting councillor for Castle ward

Tom Woodhead was a sitting councillor for Intake.

Roger Barton was a sitting councillor for Nether Shire

References

1978 English local elections
1978
1970s in Sheffield